"The Closer I Get to You" is a romantic ballad performed by singer-songwriter Roberta Flack and soul musician Donny Hathaway. The song was written by James Mtume and Reggie Lucas, two former members of Miles Davis's band, who were members of Flack's band at the time. Produced by Atlantic Records, the song was released on Flack's 1977 album Blue Lights in the Basement, and as a single in 1978. It became a major crossover hit, becoming Flack's biggest commercial hit after her success with her 1973 solo single, "Killing Me Softly with His Song". Originally set as a solo single, Flack's manager, David Franklin, suggested a duet with Hathaway, which resulted in the finished work.

"The Closer I Get to You" spent two weeks as number one on the Hot Soul Singles chart in April 1978, and peaked at number two on the Billboard Hot 100 behind Yvonne Elliman's "If I Can't Have You" and Wings' "With a Little Luck". The song charted in the top ten spots for fourteen weeks in Canada and one week in France. It was eventually certified gold in the United States in May 1978, and became one of their most familiar duets.

Background and composition
"The Closer I Get to You" was written by Reggie Lucas and James Mtume, who were members of Roberta Flack's touring band and played on Blue Lights in the Basement. They wrote the song between tours and, during the sessions for the album, brought it to Flack's producer Joe Ferla, who played it for Flack. Ferla, Flack (as Rubina Flake) and Gene McDaniels produced the track, with Ahmet Ertegun serving as executive producer. Flack and Donny Hathaway, good friends while attending Howard University, had recorded a self-titled album of duets in 1972. Five years later, the duo collaborated again on "The Closer I Get to You".

"The Closer I Get to You" was not originally written as a duet. Flack's manager David Franklin, who had worked with Hathaway in the past, decided to re-write the song to include him. Hathaway had been suffering from severe bouts of clinical depression at the time, which often forced him to be hospitalized. The depression also caused mood swings, which adversely affected his partnership with Flack, who, following Hathaway's death, would tell Jet magazine:
I tried to reach out to Donny. That's how we managed to do the song we did last year. I felt this need because I didn't know what to do. I couldn't save him, I knew he was sick. But I knew when he sat down at that piano and sang for me it was like it was eight or nine years ago because he sang and played his ass off. In fact Hathaway's suffering had made it impossible for him to travel from Chicago to New York City to join Flack in the studio to record "The Closer I Get to You": Flack recorded her part of the song with a session singer as a stopgap duet partner, the track being sent to Chicago for Hathaway to add his vocal and then back to New York City for its final mixing.

Flack announced that "The Closer I Get to You" would forever be a dedication to Hathaway, and that all money made from the song would be donated to Hathaway's widow and two children. According to the sheet music published at Musicnotes.com by Sony/ATV Music Publishing, "The Closer I Get to You" is set in common time and moves at a tempo of 90 beats per minute. The song is written in the key of A major and follows the chord progression Dmaj9–Cm7–Fm7–Amaj7. Flack sings in the vocal range of C4–F5. "The Closer I Get to You" was released as a 7-inch single with "Love is the Healing" as its B-side.

Reception

Critical reception and accolades
Critics described "The Closer I Get to You" as Flack at the top of her form. The song came in at number 40 on Billboard poll of "The 40 Biggest Duets Of All Time", where it was described a "tender tune". Authors of All Music Guide To Rock: The Definitive Guide to Rock, Pop, and Soul described the song as ethereal. Alan Light of Vibe magazine characterized it as intimate and effortless as an overheard conversation. Author of 1001 Ways to Be Romantic, Gregory J. P. Godek, included the song in a list of "Best Love Song Duets". A writer of Jet magazine described the song as a "pop-soul classic". Carolyn Quick Tillery, author of Celebrating Our Equality, described the song as a lasting musical legacy. Devon Jarvis of Women's Health included Flack and Hathaway's version of "The Closer I Get to You" in "Favorite Karaoke Duets". While opening the "R&B Vault", Gail Mitchell of Billboard praised the song as a 1970s-era classic. While reviewing Blue Lights in the Basement, Jason Elias of the website Allmusic wrote, "The track easily attains the grace and gorgeous sound that a lot of the like-minded songs here just miss." Lewis Dene of BBC described "The Closer I Get to You" as a "soul masterpiece". Both Hathaway and Flack were nominated for a Grammy Award for their duet.

Chart performance
The song became the duo's second number one on the US R&B charts in 1978, and climbed to the number two spot on the Billboard Hot 100. "The Closer I Get to You" also peaked at number three on the Adult Contemporary charts.

Music video
A music video for "The Closer I Get to You" was shot and directed by Roberta Flack herself. The video begins with Flack's singing while sitting by a piano in a candle-lit room. Hathaway had died by the time the music video was shot, so as his verse plays, the camera zooms into a picture of Hathaway located on a table behind Flack's shoulder. Flack performs the rest of the song sitting by the piano, and the camera's direction occasionally looks over a candle flame during Hathaway's verses. The video ends with Flack's mouthing some of Hathaway's lyrics as she fades into the camera's view of the room lit by a single candle. A version of Flack's performing the song live circulated as its promotional music video.

Charts and certifications

Weekly charts

Year-end charts

Certification

Luther Vandross and Beyoncé version

Luther Vandross and Beyoncé's 2003 cover version of the song appeared on both Vandross' final album Dance with My Father and Beyoncé's solo debut Dangerously in Love. Their version was recorded at The Hit Factory and the Right Track Studios, in New York City. It follows a tempo of 98 beats per minute, slightly faster than the original version. The track was included on the soundtrack of the brazilian telenovela Celebridade. It is set in the key of E major, and follows the chord progression Gm7–Cm7–Emaj9–A. It was serviced to US urban contemporary and urban adult contemporary radio on June 13, 2004.

Reception
Sal Cinquemani of Slant Magazine called the song "dated" and wrote that it felt out of place on Dangerously in Love. Erika Ramirez of Billboard magazine also noted that "While the singer holds her own alongside the legend, the quiet storm duet feels out of place considering the electrifying feel of majority of the album." Neil Drumming of Entertainment Weekly said: "A remake of 'The Closer I Get to You' with Luther Vandross also sounds, sadly, a little dated." Spence D. of IGN commented "By the time Beyoncé has teamed up with the granddaddy of contemporary love jams, Luthor Vandross, on 'The Closer I Get To You', her album has descended into somewhat generic terrain. Sure, her vocals are on point and the music is adequately slick." Anthony DeCurtis of Rolling Stone wrote, "While she oozes charisma and has a fine voice, Beyoncé isn't in a class with the likes of Whitney Houston or Mariah Carey as a singer, a fact that 'The Closer I Get to You', her duet with the effortlessly smooth Luther Vandross, also makes clear."

Jason King of Vibe magazine wrote that Beyoncé had some "" to follow up a Jay-Z duet with a Luther Vandross duet on the album's track-listing. Rob Fitzpatrick of NME stated that "it's the irredeemably cheesy ballad with 80s cornball Luther Vandross that will make the voices in your head demand hot, fresh blood." By contrast, Lewis Dene of BBC gave the song a positive review, stating that it is guaranteed the number one slot on the US R&B charts. Consequence of Sounds Chris Coplan noted that the song contained "unintentional cheesy vibe, [which] seems way more heart-wrenching now [in 2013] than it did a decade ago" and added that Beyoncé's vocals contained a "real sweetness and innocence". Pamelia S. Phillips, the author of Singing for Dummies, credited Beyoncé's vocal performance on "The Closer I Get to You" as one of her best. Mark Anthony Neal of PopMatters gave Beyoncé and Vandross "vocal props" for their performance in the "quiet storm", but described the overall performance as flat. During the 46th Annual Grammy Awards, this version of "The Closer I Get to You" won the Grammy Award for Best R&B Performance by a Duo or Group with Vocals.

Beyoncé and Vandross' cover of "The Closer I Get to You" debuted at number 76 on the US Hot R&B/Hip-Hop Singles and Tracks chart dated July 24, 2004. The next week it moved up to number 68, and on August 7 it peaked at number 62. The track spent a total of twenty weeks on the chart. On the airplay component of this chart, the Hot R&B/Hip-Hop Airplay, "The Closer I Get to You" spent eight weeks and reached a peak of number 60.

Formats and track listings
US promotional CD single
 "The Closer I Get to You" (radio edit) – 4:26
 "The Closer I Get to You" (instrumental) – 6:28
 "The Closer I Get to You" (call out hook) – 0:10

Credits and personnel
Credits taken from Dangerously in Love liner notes.

Lead Vocals: B. Knowles, L. Vandross
Background Vocals: Cissy Houston, Tawatha Agee, Brenda White-King, Candace Thomas
Writing: J. Mtume, R. Lucas
Recording: Stan Wallace
Vocal engineer: Nat Adderley Jr., Skip Anderson
Mix engineer: Ray Bardani
Drums: Ivan Hampden Jr.
Bass: Byron Miller

Guitars: Phil Hamilton
Percussion: Bashiri Johnson
Electric piano: Nat Adderley Jr.
Sound programing and additional keyboards: Skip Anderson
Strings: Al Brown
String Arrangement: Nat Adderley Jr.
Concert Master: Sanford Allen
Producing: Nat Adderley Jr.

Other versions
"The Closer I Get To You" has been covered many times. The first was released by Mtume on their 1978 album Kiss This World Goodbye, sung by James Mtume and Tawatha Agee.

In 1990, Toshinobu Kubota and Lynn Davis performed a live duet rendition of the song.

In 1994, a cover was recorded by the smooth jazz band Fourplay for their third studio album Elixir which featured R&B and smooth jazz singers Patti Austin and Peabo Bryson.

Fourplay's cover of the song was described as an "undistinguished version" of the original song by Allmusic's Steven McDonald.

In 1998, Dennis Brown covered the song with Janet Kay for his compilation album The Prime of Dennis Brown. This version of the song contains digital keyboards and slick production. The song was also included on Brown's compilation album Money in My Pocket: Anthology 1970-1995.

Brazilian countertenor, pop and jazz singer Edson Cordeiro covered the song in his 1999 album Disco Clubbing 2 - Mestre de Cerimônia.

In 2005, Nina Girado covered the song with Thor for her album live album Nina Live!. A writer of The Philippine Star noted that Thor "matches Nina note for note on their duet". Girado's version of the song won in the category for Best Duet Award at the Awit Awards in 2006.

It was covered by Filipino acoustic band MYMP on their 2005 album Versions, with lyrics separately sung by Chin Alcantara and Juris Fernandez.

Contemporary jazz acoustic guitarist Peter White covered the song on his 1994 rendition-packed album Reflections featuring Boney James on the tenor saxophone.

Saxophonist Kim Waters included a version of the song on the soprano saxophone on his 2007 album You Are My Lady. It features the vocals by R&B singer Lisa Fischer.

The song was covered by American pop singer Johnny Mathis on his 2008 album, A Night to Remember.

On an episode of New York Undercover, guest star singers Brandy and Tevin Campbell sang the duet at Natalie's (a club in the TV series owned by Jose Perez character Mike Torres).

On an episode of Martin, Gina (played by Tisha Campbell-Martin) and singer Keith Washington performed, "The Closer I Get to You" at a party Gina was hosting.

In the film Rush Hour 3, when Chris Tucker and Jackie Chan are at the French theater and the play has stopped, the song is sung by Tucker and Chan, with Tucker singing it in a high-pitched voice.

See also
List of RPM number-one singles of 1978
List of number-one R&B singles of 1978 (U.S.)

References

External links
 

1970s ballads
1978 singles
2003 singles
Roberta Flack songs
Donny Hathaway songs
Beyoncé songs
Luther Vandross songs
Songs written by Reggie Lucas
RPM Top Singles number-one singles
Male–female vocal duets
Pop ballads
Rhythm and blues ballads
Soul ballads
1977 songs
Songs written by James Mtume
Atlantic Records singles